In probability theory and directional statistics, a wrapped asymmetric Laplace distribution is a wrapped probability distribution that results from the "wrapping" of the asymmetric Laplace distribution around the unit circle. For the symmetric case (asymmetry parameter κ = 1), the distribution becomes a wrapped Laplace distribution. The distribution of the ratio of two circular variates (Z) from two different  wrapped exponential distributions will have a wrapped asymmetric Laplace distribution. These distributions find application in stochastic modelling of financial data.

Definition 

The probability density function of the wrapped asymmetric Laplace distribution is:

where  is the asymmetric Laplace distribution.

The cumulative distribution function  is therefore:

Characteristic function

The characteristic function of the wrapped asymmetric Laplace is just the characteristic function of the asymmetric Laplace function evaluated at integer arguments:

which yields an alternate expression for the wrapped asymmetric Laplace PDF in terms of the circular variable z=ei(θ-m) valid for all real θ and m:

where  is the Lerch transcendent function and coth() is the hyperbolic cotangent function.

Circular moments

In terms of the circular variable  the circular moments of the wrapped asymmetric Laplace distribution are the characteristic function of the asymmetric Laplace distribution evaluated at integer arguments:

The first moment is then the average value of z, also known as the mean resultant, or mean resultant vector:

The mean angle is 

and the length of the mean resultant is
 

The circular variance is then 1 − R

Generation of random variates 

See also 

 Wrapped distribution
 Directional statistics

References 

Continuous distributions
Directional statistics